Junior Bonner is a 1972 American Western film directed by Sam Peckinpah and starring Steve McQueen, Robert Preston, Joe Don Baker and Ida Lupino. The film focuses on a veteran rodeo rider as he returns to his hometown of Prescott, Arizona, to participate in an annual rodeo competition and reunite with his brother and estranged parents. Many critics consider it to be the warmest and most gentle of Peckinpah's films.

Plot
Junior "JR" Bonner is a rodeo  cowboy who is slightly past his prime though he won't admit it. Junior is first seen taping up his injuries after an unsuccessful ride on an ornery bull named Sunshine.

He returns home to Prescott, Arizona, for the Independence Day parade and rodeo. When he arrives, the Bonner family home is being bulldozed by his younger brother Curly, an entrepreneur and real-estate developer, in order to build a trailer park.
Junior's womanizing father Ace, and down-to-earth, long-suffering mother, Elvira, are estranged. Ace dreams of emigrating to Australia to rear sheep and mine gold, but he fails to obtain financing from Curly or Junior, who is broke.

After flooring his arrogant brother with a punch, Junior bribes rodeo owner Buck Roan to let him ride Sunshine again, promising him half the prize money. Buck thinks he must be crazy but Junior actually manages to pull it off this time, going the full eight seconds on the bull.

Junior walks into a travel agent's office and buys his father a one-way, first-class ticket to Australia. The film's final shot shows JR leaving his hometown, his successful ride on Sunshine continuing to put off the inevitable end of his rodeo career.

Cast
 Steve McQueen as Junior 'J.R.' Bonner
 Robert Preston as Ace Bonner
 Ida Lupino as Elvira Bonner
 Ben Johnson as Buck Roan
 Joe Don Baker as Curly Bonner
 Barbara Leigh as Charmagne
 Mary Murphy as Ruth Bonner
 Bill McKinney as Red Terwiliger
 Dub Taylor as Del
 Sandra Deel as Nurse Arlis
 Don "Red" Barry as Homer Rutledge
 Charles H. Gray as Burt

Themes 
The story explores one of Sam Peckinpah's favorite themes – the end of a traditional form of honor and the arrival of modern capitalism on the western frontier. In a memorable scene, Ace and Junior escape from the rodeo parade on Junior's horse, ending up at a deserted railway station where they drink and despair at the state of the world and their indigency. The film has enjoyed a resurgence of popularity in the mid-2000s because of retrospectives of Sam Peckinpah's work and the screenplay's predictions regarding capitalist development.

Production 
In May 1971, weeks after completing Straw Dogs in England, Sam Peckinpah returned to the United States to begin immediate work on Junior Bonner. The lyrical screenplay by Jeb Rosebrook, depicting the changing times of society and binding family ties, appealed to Peckinpah's tastes. He accepted the project, concerned with being typed as a director of violent action (at the time, The Wild Bunch was his most renowned film and Straw Dogs was in preparation to be released to theaters). Junior Bonner would be his final attempt to make a low-key, dramatic work in the vein of Noon Wine (1966) and The Ballad of Cable Hogue (1970).

Filmed on location in Prescott, Arizona, Peckinpah utilized many colorful locales and residents as extras in the film.

Reception
Released amidst a glut of rodeo-themed films, including The Honkers (1972), J.W. Coop (1972) and When the Legends Die (1972), Junior Bonner performed poorly at the box office. It earned rentals of $1.9 million in North America and $900,000 in other countries, recording an overall loss of $2,820,000.

Though the film was unwisely promoted as a typical Steve McQueen action vehicle, critical reception was still fairly good, but not enthusiastic. Peckinpah would remark, "I made a film where nobody got shot and nobody went to see it." Stinging from the financial failure of Junior Bonner but eager to work with Peckinpah again, McQueen presented him Walter Hill's screenplay to The Getaway, which they would film months after completing Junior Bonner. The second collaboration proved to be a financially successful one, as the action film would become one of the biggest box office successes of their careers.

Roger Ebert, writing for the Chicago Sun-Times, gave the film two stars out of four and called it "a flat-out disappointment, despite Peckinpah's track record and his proven ability to elegize the West...the movie simply never comes together and works as a whole. The material is terribly thin." Gary Arnold of The Washington Post stated that McQueen was given "precious little written character to play or emotion to express" and that the film was "easy to take, yet so insubstantial that there's no compelling reason to see or remember it. The film sort of drifts across the screen and fades from your mind an instant later."

The New York Times Vincent Canby wrote: "Junior Bonner, which looks like a rodeo film and sounds like a rodeo film, is a superior family comedy in disguise." Arthur D. Murphy of Variety wrote "The latterday film genre of misunderstood-rodeo-drifter gets one of its best expositions in Junior Bonner, Sam Peckinpah's latest film, which makes another of his occasional shifts away from the bloodbath. Steve McQueen stars handily in the title role, with Robert Preston and Ida Lupino returning to pix in excellent well-turned characterizations as his estranged parents." Gene Siskel of the Chicago Tribune gave the film three stars out of four, calling it "A decent picture from a fine director." Kevin Thomas of the Los Angeles Times wrote: "This lively, affectionate contemporary western, which stars Steve McQueen in one of his finest performances, is one of the most enjoyable pictures Peckinpah has ever made and surely is his most appealing. What's more, it marks the return to the screen of Robert Preston and Ida Lupino, who also are at their best."

Home media
Junior Bonner was released to DVD on May 25, 2004 by MGM Home Entertainment as a Region 1 widescreen DVD and on May 17, 2005 as a part of the box set The Steve McQueen Collection, with Junior Bonner as the fourth movie of a 4-disc set. The film was released on Blu-ray by Kino Lorber on November 6, 2017.

See also
 List of American films of 1972

References

External links 
 
 
 
 Vincent Canby review of Junior Bonner

1972 films
1972 independent films
1972 Western (genre) films
ABC Motion Pictures films
American independent films
American Western (genre) films
1970s English-language films
Films about families
Films directed by Sam Peckinpah
Films scored by Jerry Fielding
Films set in Prescott, Arizona
Independence Day (United States) films
Neo-Western films
Prescott, Arizona
Rodeo in film
Cinerama Releasing Corporation films
1972 drama films
1970s American films